Acanthogonatus recinto is a mygalomorph spider of Chile, its name arising from its type locality: Recinto, Nuble, Region VIII, Chile. Females are distinguished from those of A. franki by the spermathecae, having a more rounded and differentiated fundus and its basal portion extended internally, compared to those of A. peniasco with a narrower, longer and less sclerotized ducts; and from other species in the genus by having 1-1-1 P spines on its patella IV. Males differ from those of A.franki in the unique winglike projection at the base of the embolus.

Description
Male: total length ; cephalothorax length , width ; cephalic region length , width ; medial ocular quadrangle length (OQ) , width ; labium length , width ; sternum length , width . Its labium possesses 3 cuspules. A well-developed serrula is present; its teeth are widely spaced. Its sternal sigilla is small, oval and shallow; its sternum is rebordered. Chelicerae: rastellum is weak. A small, ventrally protruding cheliceral tumescence is present. Its leg I and tibia are cylindrical and straight, with no apophysis; its metatarsus is also straight. Its cephalothorax, legs, and palpi are a reddish-brown colour, while its abdomen is a light yellowish brown, with numerous dorsal mottles and a darker chevron.
Female: total length ; cephalothorax length , width ; cephalic region length , width ; fovea width ; (OQ) , width ; labium length , width ; sternum length , width . Its cephalic region is of medium convexity; its fovea shaped straight to procurved, with a small posterior notch. Its labium possesses 4 cuspules. A well-developed serrula is present. Its sternal sigilla is small, oval and shallow; its sternum is rebordered. Chelicerae: rastellum is weak. Color similar to male.

Distribution
It is found in only a few localities in Regions VIII and IX in Chile.

References

External links

 ADW entry

ZipcodeZoo entry

Pycnothelidae
Spiders of South America
Spiders described in 1995
Endemic fauna of Chile